Fitou is a commune in the Aude department in southern France.

Population

Wine
Fitou has a red wine appellation; see Fitou AOC.

See also
 Corbières AOC
 Communes of the Aude department

References

External links
website

Communes of Aude
Aude communes articles needing translation from French Wikipedia